Greatest Hits: Songs from an Aging Sex Bomb is a compilation album by American country music artist K. T. Oslin, released by RCA Records in 1993. "A New Way Home", a re-recording of a track from her Love in a Small Town album, and "Feeding a Hungry Heart" were the only singles released from the project. The album also includes a re-recording of Oslin's 1988 hit "Hold Me". The album reached number 31 on the Billboard Top Country Albums chart.

Track listing

Personnel (tracks 1, 2, 3, 7, 11)
Adapted from liner notes.

 Maxi Anderson - background vocals
 Glen Ballard - Fender Rhodes (track 1), percussion (track 2), piano (track 7), programming (tracks 3, 11), rhythm arrangements, synthesizer 
 Paulinho Da Costa - percussion (track 11)
 Brandon Fields - saxophone solo (track 3)
 Randy Goodrum - synthesizer (track 3)
 Gary Grant - trumpet (track 7)
 Owen Hale - drums (track 3)
 Jerry Hey - horn arrangements, trumpet (track 7)
 Dan Higgins - saxophone (track 7)
 Kim Hutchcraft - saxophone (track 7)
 Jimmy Johnson - bass guitar
 Randy Kerber - Fender Rhodes (tracks 3, 7, 11), piano (tracks 1, 11), synthesizer (track 11)
 Michael Landau - guitar
 Edie Lehmann - background vocals
 Arnold McCuller - background vocals
 Tommy Morgan - harmonica (track 11)
 K.T. Oslin - lead vocals, background vocals
 John "J.R." Robinson - drums
 Benmont Tench - Hammond B-3 organ

Chart performance

References

1993 greatest hits albums
K. T. Oslin albums
RCA Records compilation albums